Governor Colquitt may refer to:

Alfred H. Colquitt (1824–1894), 49th Governor of Georgia
Oscar Branch Colquitt (1861–1940), 25th Governor of Texas